The 2020–21 Ferencvárosi TC season was the club's 122nd season in existence and the 12th consecutive season in the top flight of Hungarian football. In addition to the domestic league, Ferencváros participated in this season's editions of the Hungarian Cup and the UEFA Champions League. The season covers the period from July 1 2020 to 30 June 2021.

Players

First-team squad

Transfers

In

Out

Loan out

Pre–season and friendlies

Competitions

Overview

Nemzeti Bajnokság I

League table

Results summary

Results by round

Matches

Hungarian Cup

UEFA Champions League

Group stage

The group stage draw was held on 1 October 2020.

Statistics

Appearances and goals
Last updated on 9 May 2021.

|-
|colspan="14"|Youth players:

|}

Top scorers
Includes all competitive matches. The list is sorted by shirt number when total goals are equal.
Last updated on 9 May 2021

Disciplinary record
Includes all competitive matches. Players with 1 card or more included only.

Last updated on 9 May 2021

Overall
{|class="wikitable"
|-
|Games played || 48 (33 OTP Bank Liga, 11 UEFA Champions League and 4 Hungarian Cup)
|-
|Games won || 29 (23 OTP Bank Liga, 3 UEFA Champions League and 3 Hungarian Cup)
|-
|Games drawn || 12 (9 OTP Bank Liga, 3 UEFA Champions League and 0 Hungarian Cup)
|-
|Games lost || 7 (1 OTP Bank Liga, 5 UEFA Champions League and 1 Hungarian Cup)
|-
|Goals scored || 97
|-
|Goals conceded || 48
|-
|Goal difference || +49
|-
|Yellow cards || 91
|-
|Red cards || 2
|-
|rowspan="1"|Worst discipline ||  Aïssa Laïdouni (10 , 0 )
|-
|rowspan="3"|Best result || 5–0 (H) v Paks - Nemzeti Bajnokság I - 11-9-2020
|-
| 6–1 (A) v Ráckeve - Hungarian Cup - 19-9-2020
|-
| 5–0 (A) v Bicske - Hungarian Cup - 14-11-2020
|-
|rowspan="1"|Worst result || 1–5 (A) v Barcelona - UEFA Champions League - 20-10-2020
|-
|rowspan="1"|Most appearances ||  Tokmac Nguen (45 appearances)
|-
|rowspan="2"|Top scorer ||  Myrto Uzuni (15 goals)
|-
|  Tokmac Nguen (15 goals)
|-
|Points || 99/144 (68.75%)
|-

References

External links

Ferencvárosi TC seasons
Ferencvárosi TC
Ferencvárosi TC